Hominy Falls is an unincorporated community in Nicholas County, West Virginia, United States. It is named after the falls on nearby Hominy Creek.

Gallery

References

Unincorporated communities in Nicholas County, West Virginia
Unincorporated communities in West Virginia